Paulo Barreto Menezes (October 9, 1925 – February 15, 2016) was a Brazilian civil engineer and politician. He served as the Governor of the state of Sergipe from 1971 to 1975.

Barreto Menezes died from cardiac arrest at the Unidade de Terapia Intensiva (UTI) hospital in Aracaju, Sergipe, on February 15, 2016, at the age of 90. He was being treated for a pulmonary infection at the time. He was buried in the Colina da Saudade cemetery in Aracaju.

References

1925 births
2016 deaths
Governors of Sergipe
Brazilian civil engineers
People from Aracaju